Escaline (3,5-methoxy-4-ethoxyphenethylamine) is a psychedelic drug and entheogen of the phenethylamine class of compounds. Escaline was first synthesized and reported in the scientific literature by Benington, et al., in 1954, but was later re-examined in the laboratory of David E. Nichols, who prepared a series of mescaline analogues that included escaline, proscaline, and isoproscaline.  The effects of this and related mescaline analogues in humans were first described by Alexander Shulgin. In his book PiHKAL (Phenethylamines i Have Known And Loved), Shulgin lists the dosage range as 40 to 60 mg, consumed orally.  The duration of action was stated to be 8–12 hours.

Escaline is the phenethylamine analog of 3C-E and the 4-ethoxy analog of mescaline.

Legal status 
Escaline is illegal in Sweden as of 26 January 2016.

Escaline is a Schedule I controlled substance (DEA #7930) in the United States as it is a positional isomer of TMA (3,4,5-trimethoxyamphetamine).

References

See also 
 Functional analog (chemistry)

Psychedelic phenethylamines
Designer drugs
Phenol ethers
Mescalines